Jašar Ahmedovski (Macedonian and Serbian Cyrillic: Јашар Ахмедовски; born 22 December 1964) is a Serbian and Macedonian folk singer. His albums were released on numerous labels, including Jugodisk, Diskos and Grand Production. He also released three albums with Južni Vetar.

His younger brother, Ipče, was also a successful singer. He is married to his wife Snežana Ahmedovski.

Discography
 Za srca zaljubljena (1982)
 Jednoj ženi za sećanje (1983) 
 Mnogo si me usrećila (1984)
 Dečak zaljubljeni (1986)
 Pomiri me sa najdražom (1987)
 Žena moje mladosti (1987)
 Zabraniću suzama (1989)
 Zarobi me (1990)
 Dobar momak (1993)
 Kad sveća dogori (1995)
 Moj bagreme beli (1996)
 A oko mene ženski svet (1997)
 Venčajte me sa njenom lepotom (1997)
 Ne bilo mi što mi majka misli (2000)
 Koja žena prokle mene (2002)
 Malo ljubav malo greh (2005)
 Idi sve je gotovo (2007)
 Na njenu će dušu sve (2012)

References

1963 births
Living people
Serbian folk singers
20th-century Serbian male singers
Macedonian folk singers
Yugoslav male singers
People from Prilep Municipality
Macedonian turbo-folk singers
Macedonian folk-pop singers
Serbian turbo-folk singers